A general election was held in the U.S. state of Minnesota on November 8, 2022. All of Minnesota's executive officers were up for election as well as all the seats in the Minnesota Senate and the Minnesota House of Representatives, several judicial seats, Minnesota's eight seats in the United States House of Representatives, and several seats for local offices. Primary elections to nominate major party candidates and several judicial and local primary elections were held on August 9, 2022.

The Democratic–Farmer–Labor Party (DFL) won a majority of the Minnesota Senate for the first time since 2016, while maintaining its majority in the Minnesota House of Representatives and control of all statewide offices, and as such won full control of Minnesota state government for the first time since 2014.

State elections

Executive elections

Governor 

Incumbent DFL Governor Tim Walz sought re-election. Also running were Republican Scott Jensen, Steve Patterson for Grassroots–Legalize Cannabis, James McCaskel for Legal Marijuana Now, Hugh McTavish for Independence-Alliance, and Gabrielle Prosser for the Socialist Workers Party.

Walz won re-election to a second term with 52.3% of the vote.

Secretary of State 

Incumbent DFL Secretary of State Steve Simon won re-election to a third term with 54.5% of the vote. He defeated Republican Kim Crockett.

State Auditor 

Incumbent DFL State Auditor Julie Blaha ran for re-election to a second term. Also running were Republican Ryan Wilson, Will Finn for Grassroots–Legalize Cannabis, and Tim Davis for Legal Marijuana Now.

Blaha narrowly won the election with 47.5% of the vote, compared to Wilson's 47.1%.

Attorney General 

Incumbent DFL Attorney General Keith Ellison ran for re-election. He has challenged by Republican Jim Schultz.

Ellison narrowly won the election with 50.4% of the vote, compared to Schultz's 49.5%.

Legislative elections

Minnesota Senate 

All 67 seats in the Minnesota Senate were up for election in 2022. The Republicans held a majority of 34 seats, with the DFL holding 31 and independents holding 2. 

The DFL was able to pick up three seats, giving them a 1-seat majority in the chamber.

Minnesota House of Representatives 

All 134 seats in the Minnesota House of Representatives were up for election in 2022. The DFL held a majority of 69 seats before the election. 

The DFL picked up a seat, increasing their majority to 70 seats compared to the Republican's 61.

Judicial elections 
Two seats on the Minnesota Supreme Court were up for election. Justice Natalie Hudson won re-election. Justice Gordon Moore sought his first election following his appointment in 2020. Both were unopposed. 10 seats on the Minnesota Court of Appeals and several seats on the Minnesota District Courts were also up for election.

Federal elections

United States House of Representatives 

Minnesota's eight seats in the United States House of Representatives were up for election. The DFL and the Republicans currently hold four seats each. 

All incumbents won re-election.

Local elections 
Elections for several subdivisions were be held—including elections for counties, municipalities, school districts, and hospital districts.

References

External links 

 Elections & Voting - Minnesota Secretary of State

 
Minnesota